Pavol Cicman (born 30 January 1985) is a Slovak football striker who plays for 1.FK Svidník in 3. liga.

Career

Club
In July 2011, he joined Piast Gliwice on a one-year contract.

In September 2014, he went on trial to Italian Lega Pro (third division) outfit Juve Stabia, but was ultimately not signed.

References

External links
 
 Profile at piast.gliwice.pl 
 

1985 births
Living people
Slovak footballers
Association football forwards
1. FC Tatran Prešov players
ŠK Futura Humenné players
MFK Dolný Kubín players
Slovak Super Liga players
Piast Gliwice players
Bohemians 1905 players
FK Senica players
Expatriate footballers in Poland
Expatriate footballers in the Czech Republic